James David Andrews (born July 10, 1992) is an American football center for the New England Patriots of the National Football League (NFL). He played college football at Georgia. His uncle was former Dallas Cowboys player, Denver Broncos and Atlanta Falcons head coach Dan Reeves.

High school career
Andrews attended Wesleyan School in Peachtree Corners, Georgia, where he was a two-way lineman. In his sophomore year, Wesleyan won the 2008 GHSA Class A state championship. For his junior and senior seasons, his coaches attributed him with over a hundred knockdown blocks while not allowing a quarterback sack. Andrews was named 2010 Gwinnett County Offensive Lineman of the Year and made the All-County First-team Offense of the Gwinnett Daily Post.

Regarded as a three-star recruit by Rivals.com, Andrews was ranked as the No. 9 center prospect in the class of 2011, which was headed by Reese Dismukes. Andrews had offers from Duke and Michigan but, as a “lifelong die-hard Bulldogs fan,” waited for Georgia to offer and committed “practically on the spot” when he got the offer in February 2010.

College career
In his true freshman season at Georgia, Andrews appeared in ten games. He earned Athletic Director's Honor Roll distinction for fall semester. In his sophomore year, Andrews filled the void left at center by the graduation of Ben Jones. Andrews started all 14 games, helping to protect quarterback Aaron Murray. After the Auburn game in early November, he was named SEC Offensive Lineman of the Week as he graded out at 88 percent and had six “dominator” blocks and three knockdowns.

As a junior, Andrews was named to the preseason watch list for the Rimington Trophy. He started all 13 games at center and protected quarterback Murray such that Georgia ranked second in passing in the SEC. At the conclusion of spring practice of his senior year, he was named Offensive MVP, and also preseason Third-team All-SEC by Phil Steele. Andrews added another 13 starts in as many games over his senior season, totaling 50 games for his college career. He won Georgia's Vince Dooley Most Valuable Player Award, was selected second-team All-SEC by the Associated Press, and was named one of six finalists for the Rimington Trophy.

Professional career

Andrews went undrafted in the 2015 NFL Draft, but signed with the New England Patriots as a free agent on May 8, 2015. He stood out at Patriot training camp and played more than expected in preseason, starting every preseason game due to injuries to starting center Bryan Stork and reserve center/guard Ryan Wendell. Andrews made the Patriots 2015 53-man roster and started at center in Week 1 against the Pittsburgh Steelers after Stork was placed on injured reserve with the designation to return and Wendell was inactive. Andrews started every game through Week 10, playing every snap over the first half of the season. Although he was not selected to the 2016 Pro Bowl, Andrews finished in the top two in fan voting at the position. As a result of his high snap count and low salary, Andrews received a performance-based pay bonus of $237,427.11, the second-highest of any Patriot in 2015 (after cornerback Malcolm Butler).

In 2016, Andrews faced competition from Bryan Stork for the starting center job and ultimately won, leading to Stork's release from the team. He started all 16 regular-season games for the Patriots on an offensive line that led the team to a 14–2 record. Andrews started in Super Bowl LI against the Atlanta Falcons in the first overtime game and largest comeback in Super Bowl history; the Patriots trailed 28–3 late in the third quarter, but rallied to win by a score of 34–28.

On May 12, 2017, Andrews signed a three-year contract extension with the Patriots through the 2020 season. The deal has a base value of $9.6 million, with a $1.6 million signing bonus, and an additional $2.1 million in incentives. On September 5, 2017, Andrews was named a Patriots captain for the first time in his career. Andrews started 17 of 19 games for the Patriots, including their Super Bowl LII loss to the Philadelphia Eagles.

Andrews once again started all 16 games at center for the Patriots in 2018. Andrews helped the Patriots reach their third straight Super Bowl appearance after they defeated the Los Angeles Chargers and Kansas City Chiefs in the playoffs; they defeated the Los Angeles Rams by a score of 13–3 in Super Bowl LIII. Andrews had a fumble recovery in the victory.

On August 26, 2019, it was revealed that Andrews was diagnosed with a pulmonary embolism, putting his 2019 season in jeopardy. He was placed on season-ending injured reserve on August 31, 2019.

Andrews returned to the Patriots starting lineup in 2020 after missing all of 2019. On September 26, 2020, he was placed on injured reserve after undergoing surgery on his thumb. He was activated on October 24.

On March 22, 2021, Andrews re-signed with the Patriots on a four-year deal.

Personal life
Andrews and his wife Mackenzie were married on April 8, 2017. His uncle, the late Dan Reeves, played and coached in the NFL.

References

External links

 New England Patriots bio

1992 births
Living people
American football centers
Georgia Bulldogs football players
New England Patriots players
People from Peachtree Corners, Georgia
Players of American football from Georgia (U.S. state)
Sportspeople from the Atlanta metropolitan area